Justice Comstock may refer to:

George F. Comstock (1811–1892), judge of the New York Court of Appeals
Gideon Comstock (1709–1801), associate justice of the Rhode Island Supreme Court

See also
Dorothy Comstock Riley (1924–2004), justice of the Michigan Supreme Court